Richard Pittman (born May 10, 1957) is a former New Zealand boxer who competed for the Cook Islands.

Pittman competed at the 1988 Summer Olympics in Seoul as an entrant in the featherweight division. He received a bye in the first round and then beat Dumsane Mabuza from Swaziland 4–1 on points before losing to Ya'acov Shmuel from Israel 0–5 on points. He also competed at the 1978 and 1990 Commonwealth Games.

In 1992 he made his professional debut, and over the nine years he had 15 fights winning 8 and losing 7.

References

External links
 

1957 births
Living people
Featherweight boxers
Boxers at the 1978 Commonwealth Games
Boxers at the 1990 Commonwealth Games
Commonwealth Games competitors for the Cook Islands
Boxers at the 1988 Summer Olympics
New Zealand professional boxing champions
Cook Island male boxers
Olympic boxers of the Cook Islands